Cuba has several traditional games.

Traditional games

Bolas 
Bolas involves participants shooting marbles to make them get as close to each other as possible.

Cuatro esquinas 
Cuatro esquinas (transl. four corners) is a variation of baseball in which the only equipment used is a rubber ball. Players hit the ball using their hands and then attempt to run around the four corners of a square to score, with gameplay being similar to baseball. Baseball5 is an internationally played sport invented by the World Baseball Softball Confederation which is partially based on this game.

Cuban dominoes 
Cuban dominoes is a game played by two teams of two players in which the goal is to reach a certain score using their dominoes as fast as possible.

El quemado 
The game is similar to dodgeball.

Fútbol de tres 
This game is a type of street football played by two teams of three players.

Juego del taco 

El juego del taco (transl. game involving a bat) is a game with similarities to baseball and street cricket.

References 

Cuba-related lists